An iron man match is a professional wrestling match type that is set to go a specific amount of time, usually 30 or 60 minutes, with the competitor with the most falls at the end of that time named the victor. On the occasions of a draw, a sudden death "final fall" may be requested by either side, with the other able to accept or decline, or an authority can order the match to go into overtime in the case of any championship match.

Rules
Iron man matches generally operate under the same rules as any other professional wrestling bout, but instead of the match having to be over before a time limit is up, the iron man match goes the full length of the allotted time, with each wrestler attempting to score as many falls in that time as possible. The wrestler who has the most decisions at the end of the match is declared the winner. Iron Man matches can also be contested with specific win conditions. Kurt Angle and Chris Benoit competed in a 30-minute Iron Man match at Backlash 2001 where only submissions were counted, which was termed an "Ultimate Submission match".

Some iron man matches have an interval between falls. In 2009, a match between John Cena and Randy Orton had a 30-second rest period after each fall, in part due to that match being billed as "anything goes" (only pinfalls and submissions counted as falls, which can also be done outside the ring, but not count outs or disqualifications). The 2003 match between Kurt Angle and Brock Lesnar had a 15-second rest period after each fall, regardless of how it occurred.

Should the match result in a tie, sudden death overtime may be requested by either wrestler as a plot device, and it is accepted or rejected by either an opponent or an authority figure. After Shawn Michaels and Kurt Angle tied 2–2 in a 30-minute iron man match, Michaels begged Angle to go sudden death, but Angle walked off.

Sudden deaths are especially common in  title matches. This is because, in the event of a draw, the champion will always retain the title.  Commissioner Gorilla Monsoon ordered sudden death (after onscreen president "Rowdy" Roddy Piper had stated that there "must be a winner") after Shawn Michaels and Bret Hart failed to score a decision at WrestleMania XII, and Christopher Daniels requested sudden death against A.J. Styles at TNA's Against All Odds in February 2005.

Iron man match history

World Wrestling Entertainment (WWE)
Several iron man matches have taken place at house shows. The Rockers faced off against The Fabulous Rougeaus twice in 1989. Bret Hart wrestled one in 1993 against Ric Flair and four in 1994 against his brother, Owen Hart. John Cena and Seth Rollins  faced off in a 30-Minute Iron Man match for the WWE United States Championship at a house show in October 2015. Kevin Owens and AJ Styles faced off in a 30-Minute Iron Man match for the WWE Intercontinental Championship at a house show in March 2016.

Participant list

Males

Females

World Championship Wrestling (WCW)

Participant list

Total Nonstop Action Wrestling (TNA) / Impact Wrestling

Participant list

Males

Females

All Elite Wrestling (AEW)

Participant list

References

External links
WWE.com – Iron Man match description

Professional wrestling match types